WAGP (88.7 FM) is a radio station broadcasting a Christian talk format. Licensed to Beaufort, South Carolina, United States, the station is currently owned by Community Broadcasting Corp. of Beaufort, Inc.

WAGP features programming from Salem Communications and from the Moody Broadcasting Network.  The station also produces local call-in shows, an advice show aimed at women, daily bible study and a rebroadcast of the weekly sermon at a local church.

References

External links

AGP
Talk radio stations in the United States
Radio stations established in 1986
1986 establishments in South Carolina